The Indiana Pacers are an American professional basketball team based in Indianapolis. The Pacers compete in the National Basketball Association (NBA) as a member of the league's Eastern Conference Central Division. The Pacers were first established in 1967 as a member of the American Basketball Association (ABA) and became a member of the NBA in 1976 as a result of the ABA–NBA merger. They play their home games at Gainbridge Fieldhouse. The team is named after the state of Indiana's history with the Indianapolis 500's pace cars and with the harness racing industry.

The Pacers have won three championships, all in the ABA. The Pacers were NBA Eastern Conference champions in 2000. The team has won nine division titles. Six Hall of Fame players – Reggie Miller, Chris Mullin, Alex English, Mel Daniels, Roger Brown, and George McGinnis – played with the Pacers for multiple seasons. Hall of Famers Adrian Dantley, Gus Johnson, and Tim Hardaway also played for the Pacers. The franchise has multiple Hall of Fame coaches in Bobby "Slick" Leonard, Jack Ramsay, as well as Larry Brown.

Franchise history

1967–1976: ABA dynasty

In early 1967, a group of six investors (attorney Richard Tinkham, John DeVoe, Chuck DeVoe, entrepreneur Lyn Treece, sports agent Chuck Barnes, and Indianapolis Star sports writer Bob Collins) pooled their resources to purchase a franchise in the proposed American Basketball Association.

For their first seven years, they played in the Indiana State Fairgrounds Coliseum. In 1974, they moved to the plush new Market Square Arena in downtown Indianapolis, where they played for 25 years.

Early in the Pacers' second season, former Indiana Hoosiers standout Bob "Slick" Leonard became the team's head coach, replacing Larry Staverman. Leonard quickly turned the Pacers into a juggernaut. His teams were buoyed by the great play of superstars such as Mel Daniels, George McGinnis, Bob Netolicky, Rick Mount, Freddie Lewis and Roger Brown. The Pacers were – and ended – as the most successful team in ABA history, winning three ABA Championships in four years. In all, they appeared in the ABA Finals five times in the league's nine-year history, which was an ABA record.

1976–1987: Early NBA struggles
The Pacers were one of four ABA teams that joined the NBA in the ABA–NBA merger in 1976. For the 1976–77 season, the Pacers were joined in the merged league by the Denver Nuggets, New York Nets, and San Antonio Spurs.

The league charged a $3.2 million entry fee for each former ABA team. Since the NBA would only agree to accept four ABA teams in the ABA–NBA merger, the Pacers and the three other surviving ABA teams also had to compensate the two remaining ABA franchises which were not a part of the merger, the Spirits of St. Louis and Kentucky Colonels. As a result of the merger, the four teams dealt with financial troubles. Additionally, the Pacers had some financial troubles, which dated back to their waning days in the ABA; they had begun selling off some of their star players in the last ABA season. The new NBA teams also were barred from sharing in national TV revenues for four years.

The Pacers finished their inaugural NBA season with a record of 36–46. Billy Knight and Don Buse represented Indiana in the NBA All-Star Game. However, this was one of the few bright spots of the Pacers' first 13 years in the NBA. During this time, they had only two non-losing seasons and only two playoff appearances.

A lack of continuity became the norm for most of the next decade, as they traded away Knight and Buse before the 1977–78 season even started. They acquired Adrian Dantley in exchange for Knight, but Dantley (who was averaging nearly 27 points per game at the time) was traded in December, while the Pacers' second-leading scorer, John Williamson, was dealt in January.

The early Pacers came out on the short end of two of the most one-sided trades in NBA history. In 1980, they traded Alex English to the Nuggets to reacquire former ABA star George McGinnis. McGinnis was long past his prime and contributed very little during his two-year return. English, in contrast, went on to become one of the greatest scorers in NBA history. The next year, they traded a 1984 draft pick to the Portland Trail Blazers for center Tom Owens, who had played for the Pacers during their last ABA season. Owens played one year for the Pacers with little impact and was out of the league altogether a year later. In 1983–84, the Pacers finished with the worst record in the Eastern Conference, which would have given the Pacers the second overall pick in the draft—the pick that the Blazers used to select Sam Bowie while Michael Jordan was still available. As a result of the Owens trade, they were left as bystanders in the midst of one of the deepest drafts in NBA history—including such future stars as Jordan, Hakeem Olajuwon, Sam Perkins, Charles Barkley, and John Stockton.

Clark Kellogg was drafted by the Pacers in the 1982 and finished second in the Rookie of the Year voting, but the Pacers finished the 1982–83 season with their all-time worst record of 20–62 and won only 26 games the following season. After winning 22 games in 1984–85 and 26 games in 1985–86, Jack Ramsay replaced George Irvine as coach and led the Pacers to a 41–41 record in 1986–87 and their second playoff appearance as an NBA team. Chuck Person, nicknamed "The Rifleman" for his renowned long-range shooting, led the team in scoring as a rookie and won NBA Rookie of the Year honors. Their first playoff win in NBA franchise history was earned in Game 3 of their first-round, best-of-five series against the Atlanta Hawks, but it was their only victory in that series, as the Hawks defeated them in four games.

1987–2005: The Reggie Miller era

Reggie Miller from UCLA was drafted by the Pacers in 1987, beginning his career as a backup to John Long. Many fans at the time disagreed with Miller's selection over Indiana Hoosiers' standout Steve Alford. The Pacers missed the playoffs in 1987–88, drafted Rik Smits in the 1988 NBA draft, and suffered through a disastrous 1988–89 season in which coach Jack Ramsay stepped down following an 0–7 start. Mel Daniels and George Irvine filled in on an interim basis before Dick Versace took over the 6–23 team on the way to a 28–54 finish. In February 1989, the team traded veteran center Herb Williams to the Dallas Mavericks for future NBA Sixth Man-of-the Year Detlef Schrempf.

From 1989 to 1993, the Pacers would play at or near .500 and qualify for the playoffs; in 1989–90, the Pacers parlayed a fast start into the team's third playoff appearance under coach Bob Hill. But the Pacers were swept by the Detroit Pistons, who would go on to win their second consecutive NBA Championship. Reggie Miller became the first Pacer to play in the All-Star Game since 1976 on the strength of his 24.6 points-per-game average. Despite four straight first-round exits, this period was highlighted by a first-round series with the Boston Celtics in 1991 that went to Game 5. The next season, the Pacers returned to the playoffs in 1992 and met the Celtics for the second year in a row. But this time, the Celtics left no doubt who was the better team, as they swept the Pacers in three straight games. Chuck Person and point guard Micheal Williams were traded to the Minnesota Timberwolves in the off-season, and the Pacers got Pooh Richardson and Sam Mitchell in return. For the 1992–93 season, Detlef Schrempf moved from sixth man to the starter at small forward and was elected to his first All-Star game. Meanwhile, Miller became the Pacers' all-time NBA era leading scorer during this season (4th overall). The Pacers returned to the playoffs with a 41–41 record, but lost to the New York Knicks in the first round, three games to one.

1994–1997: Larry Brown era
Larry Brown was brought aboard as Pacers' coach for the 1993–94 season, and Pacers' general manager Donnie Walsh completed a then highly criticized trade as he sent Schrempf to the Seattle SuperSonics in exchange for Derrick McKey and little known Gerald Paddio. But the Pacers won their last eight games of the season to finish with an NBA-era franchise-high 47 wins. They stormed past Shaquille O'Neal and the Orlando Magic in a first-round sweep to earn their first NBA playoff series win, and pulled off an upset by defeating the top-seeded Atlanta Hawks in the Conference semifinals.

Back–to–back Eastern Conference Finals appearances
With the 1994 Eastern Conference Finals tied going into Game 5 in New York, and the Pacers trailing the Knicks by 15 points early in the fourth quarter, Reggie Miller scored 25 points in that quarter, including five 3-point field goals. Miller also flashed the choke sign to the Knicks' number one fan, Spike Lee, while leading the Pacers to the come from behind victory. The Knicks ultimately came back to win the next two games and the series. Miller was a tri-captain and leading scorer of the USA Basketball team that won the gold medal at the 1994 FIBA World Championship.

Mark Jackson joined the team in an off-season trade with the Los Angeles Clippers, giving the team a steady hand at the point guard position that had been lacking in recent years. The Pacers enjoyed a 52–30 campaign in 1994–95, giving them their first Central Division title and first 50+ win season since the ABA days. The team swept the Hawks in the first round, before another meeting with the rival Knicks in the Conference semifinals. This time, with the Pacers down six points with 16.4 seconds remaining in Game 1, Miller scored eight points in 8.9 seconds to help secure a two-point victory. The Pacers beat the Knicks in seven games. They pushed the Magic to seven games before falling in the Eastern Conference Finals.

Injury-plagued seasons
The Pacers duplicated their 52–30 record in 1995–96, but were hurt severely by an injury to Reggie Miller's eye socket in April, from which he was not able to return until Game 5 of their first-round series against the Hawks. Miller scored 29 points in that game, but the Hawks came away with a two-point victory to put an early end to Indiana's season. This 1995–96 team did manage to go down in history as the only team to defeat the Chicago Bulls twice that year, a Bulls team which made history with a then all-time best 72–10 record. The Pacers could not withstand several key injuries in 1996–97, nor could they handle the absence of Mark Jackson, who had been traded to the Denver Nuggets before the season (though they did re-acquire Jackson at the trading deadline). The Pacers finished 39–43 and missed the playoffs for the first time in seven years, after which coach Larry Brown stepped down.

1997–2000: Larry Bird era
In the 1997–98 NBA season, Indiana native and former Boston Celtics great Larry Bird was hired as head coach. He led the Pacers to a 19-game improvement over the previous season, finishing 58–24 – at the time, the most the franchise had ever won as an NBA team, and tying the 1970–71 ABA Pacers for the franchise record.

Back–to–back Eastern Conference Finals appearances
Chris Mullin joined the team in the off-season and immediately became a valuable part of the Pacers lineup—and starting small forward. Assistant coaches Rick Carlisle, in charge of the offense, and Dick Harter, who coached the defense, were key in getting the most out of the Pacers' role players such as Dale Davis, Derrick McKey and a young Antonio Davis. Miller and Rik Smits both made the All-Star team that year, and in the playoffs, the Pacers breezed past the Cleveland Cavaliers and New York Knicks before falling to the Chicago Bulls in a seven-game Eastern Conference Finals.

In the lockout-shortened 1998–99 season, the Pacers won the Central Division with a 33–17 record and swept the Milwaukee Bucks and Philadelphia 76ers before falling to the Knicks in a six-game Eastern Conference Finals.

2000 NBA Finals appearance
Prior to the 1999–2000 NBA season, the Pacers traded forward Antonio Davis to the Toronto Raptors in exchange for first-round draft choice Jonathan Bender. In the 2000 NBA playoffs, after a 56–26 regular season, the Pacers survived the upset-minded Milwaukee Bucks in round one, handled the Philadelphia 76ers in the second round and finally broke through to the NBA Finals by virtue of a six-game East Finals victory over the New York Knicks. Their first NBA Finals appearance was against the Los Angeles Lakers, who ended Indiana's championship hopes in six games. However, the Pacers dealt Los Angeles their worst playoff defeat up to that time by a margin of 33 points in game five.

2000–2003: Isiah Thomas era
The off-season brought sweeping changes to the Pacers' lineup, as Rik Smits and coach Larry Bird retired, Chris Mullin returned to his old Golden State Warriors team, Mark Jackson signed a long-term contract with Toronto, and Dale Davis was traded to Portland for Jermaine O'Neal, who went on to average 12.9 points per game in his first year as a starter. It was a rebuilding year for the Pacers under the new head coach Isiah Thomas. However, the team still managed to return to the playoffs, where they lost to the top-seeded Philadelphia 76ers in four games.

Jermaine O'Neal's rise to stardom
In the midseason of 2001–02, the Pacers made a blockbuster trade with the Chicago Bulls that sent Jalen Rose and Travis Best to Chicago in exchange for Brad Miller, Ron Artest, Kevin Ollie and Ron Mercer. In the next few years, Miller and Artest would go on to be All-Stars for the Pacers. The trade bolstered a team that had been floundering, and the Pacers managed to return to the playoffs, where they pushed the top-seeded New Jersey Nets to five games before losing Game 5 in double overtime. Jermaine O'Neal made his first of what would be several All-Star appearances in his Pacers career.

The Pacers got off to a 13–2 start in 2002–03 but hit the wall after the All-Star break thanks in no small part to Ron Artest's multiple suspensions and family tragedies befalling Jermaine O'Neal, Jamaal Tinsley and Austin Croshere. O'Neal and Brad Miller both made the All-Star team, and the Pacers made a substantial improvement as they finished 48–34, but they suffered a loss to the underdog Boston Celtics in the first round of the playoffs.

2003–2007: Rick Carlisle era
In the 2003 off-season, the Pacers managed to re-sign O'Neal for the NBA maximum and inked Reggie Miller to a modest two-year deal, but they could not afford to keep their talented center, Brad Miller. He was dealt to the Sacramento Kings in exchange for Scot Pollard, who spent much of the following year watching from the bench and backing up Jeff Foster. The Pacers also signed Larry Bird as team president, and Bird wasted little time in dismissing coach Isiah Thomas and replacing him with Rick Carlisle.

Ron Artest's rise to stardom
The Pacers responded to Carlisle extremely well and had a breakthrough 2003–04 season in which they finished 61–21, earning the best record in the NBA as well as a franchise record. O'Neal and Artest made the All-Star team, and Artest was named the NBA's Defensive Player of the Year; the Pacers swept the Boston Celtics easily in the first round and squeezed by a scrappy Miami Heat team in the conference semifinals. But the Detroit Pistons proved an impediment to Indiana's championship aspirations, as they defeated the Pacers in six games on their way to the NBA Championship.

Miller's final season and Malice at the Palace

Al Harrington, a small forward who had established himself as one of the best sixth-men in the NBA, was dealt in the off-season to the Atlanta Hawks in return for Stephen Jackson after Harrington allegedly demanded that the Pacers start him or trade him.  Nevertheless, the Pacers started off the 2004–05 season in extremely strong fashion–until the infamous events of November 19, 2004. Toward the end of a Pacers victory over the Detroit Pistons at The Palace of Auburn Hills on November 19, 2004, the Pacers' Ron Artest committed a hard foul against Ben Wallace. Wallace retaliated with a hard push, threw a towel at Artest, and the situation escalated to a full-scale brawl, with fans and several Pacers taking part. While Artest laid atop the scorer's table trying to calm down and do an interview, Pistons fan John Green (who was sitting next to Wallace's brother) threw a cup of Diet Coke at Artest, causing him to charge into the stands. Stephen Jackson followed him into the stands while Jermaine O'Neal struck a fan who came onto the court. The game was called off with 45.9 seconds left on the clock, and the Pacers left the floor amid a shower of beer and other beverages that rained down from the stands.

Several of the involved players were suspended by NBA Commissioner David Stern. Artest was suspended for the rest of the regular season and playoffs, a total of 73 games—the longest suspension for an on-court incident in NBA history. Other suspensions included Jackson (suspended for 30 games), O'Neal (25 games), Wallace (6 games), and the Pacers' Anthony Johnson (5 games) (O'Neal's suspension was later reduced to 15 games by arbitrator Roger Kaplan, a decision that was upheld by U.S. District Judge George B. Daniels). O'Neal was charged with two counts of assault and battery, while Artest, Jackson, Johnson, and David Harrison were charged with one count each.

After the brawl and suspensions that followed, the Pacers fell downward into the Central Division. They went from a legitimate title contender to a team that hovered around .500 in winning percentage. The Pistons eventually became the Central Division champions. Despite the difficulties with the suspensions and injuries, the Pacers earned a sixth seed in the playoffs with a record of 44–38. An important reason for their strong finish was the re-acquisition of Dale Davis, who had been released by the New Orleans Hornets after being traded there by the Golden State Warriors. He played the final 25 games of the regular season and every playoff game, contributing a strong presence at center. And Davis' signing coincided with an injury to Jermaine O'Neal that would knock him out for virtually the remainder of the regular season—indeed, O'Neal's first missed game due to his injury was Davis' first game back with the Pacers.

Despite the adversity they had gone through, the Pacers made the playoffs for the 13th time in 14 years. In the first round, Indiana defeated the Atlantic Division champion Boston Celtics in seven games, winning Game 7 in Boston by the decisive margin of 97–70, just the third time the Celtics had dropped a Game 7 at home. The Pacers then advanced to the second round against the Detroit Pistons, in a rematch of the previous year's Eastern Conference Finals. The series featured games back at The Palace of Auburn Hills, the scene of the brawl that many assumed at the time had effectively ended the Pacers' season. After losing Game 1, the Pacers won the next two games to take a 2–1 lead. However, the Pacers could not repeat their victories against the Pistons and lost the next three games, losing the series 4–2. The final game (Game 6) was on May 19, 2005; Reggie Miller, in his final NBA game, scored 27 points and received a huge standing ovation from the crowd. Despite Miller's effort, the Pacers lost, sending Miller into retirement without an NBA Championship in his 18-year career, all with the Pacers. Miller had his No. 31 jersey retired by the Pacers on March 30, 2006, when the Pacers played the Phoenix Suns.

2005–2012: The Danny Granger era

The team went on to draft Danny Granger 17th overall in the 2005 NBA Draft. During the 2005–06 season, the Pacers traded Ron Artest to the Sacramento Kings in exchange for Peja Stojaković. Despite the loss of Reggie Miller, the Artest saga, and many key injuries, the Pacers made the playoffs in 2006 for the 14th time in 15 years. They also were the only road team to win Game 1 of a first-round playoff series. However, New Jersey won Game 2 to tie the series at 1–1, heading back to Indiana. In Game 3, Jermaine O'Neal scored 37 points, as the Pacers regained a 2–1 series lead. The Nets, however, won games four and five to take a 3–2 series lead. In Game 6, Anthony Johnson scored 40 points, but the Pacers' season came to an end as the Nets won 96–90. 

The Pacers finished the 2006–07 season as one of the worst seasons in team history. The turning point of the season would be an 11-game losing streak that started around the all-star break. Injuries to Jermaine O'Neal and Marquis Daniels, a lack of a solid backup point guard, the blockbuster trade midway through the season that interrupted the team chemistry, poor defensive efforts, and being the NBA's worst offensive team were the main reasons leading to the team's struggles. The April 15 loss to New Jersey Nets knocked the Pacers out of the playoffs for the first time since the 1996–97 season.

2007–2010: O'Neal's final season and rebuilding years
On April 10, 2007, the Pacers announced the firing of coach Rick Carlisle, with the Pacers' first losing record in ten seasons being the main reason for the coach's dismissal. Pacers President Larry Bird noted that Carlisle had the opportunity to return to the Pacers franchise in another role. Later, Carlisle opted to leave and took a broadcasting job with ESPN before returning to coach the Dallas Mavericks in 2008 (where he would win a championship in 2011). On May 31, 2007, Jim O'Brien was named Carlisle's successor. O'Brien made it clear that he intended to take the Pacers back to the playoffs in the 2007–08 season, but he did not and did not in his tenure. He also made it known that he favored a more up-tempo, fast-paced style as opposed to Carlisle's slower, more meticulous style of coaching. Many people have taken note that this style, while exciting at times, failed to produce a winning record, and O'Brien's inability to change his style to better suit his talent available has hurt the team.

Despite missing the playoffs in back-to-back seasons for the first time since the 1980s, the 2007–08 season displayed many signs of growth in the team, especially towards the end of the season. Off-court legal distraction from Jamaal Tinsley, Marquis Daniels, and Shawne Williams in the middle of the season did not help the Pacers struggles, and injuries to Tinsley and Jermaine O'Neal damaged the Pacers' already weak defense and left almost all point guard duties to recently acquired Travis Diener, who saw minimal minutes on his previous NBA teams. Despite this, and a 36–46 record, the Pacers had a very strong finish to the season, which included a desperate attempt to steal the 8th seed from the Atlanta Hawks, and dramatic improvement in forwards Danny Granger and Mike Dunleavy. Both Granger and Dunleavy were involved in the voting for Most Improved Player, with Dunleavy finishing in the top 10. The two were also the first Pacers players to score 1500 points each in a single season since Reggie Miller and Detlef Schrempf did it in the early 1990s.

In April of the 2007–08 season, Donnie Walsh, Pacers Sports & Entertainment CEO & President, left the Indiana Pacers to join the New York Knicks. All of Walsh's basketball-related duties were given to Pacers' President of Basketball Operations Larry Bird. Walsh's business-related roles were given to co-owner Herb Simon and Jim Morris, who was promoted to President of Pacers Sports & Entertainment.

During the 2009 off–season, the Pacers traded declining Jermaine O'Neal along with Nathan Jawai to the Toronto Raptors in exchange for Roy Hibbert, T. J. Ford, Rasho Nesterović and Maceo Baston. Hibbert would go on to be a two-time all–star for the Pacers and was known as a defensive force with his shot-blocking abilities. 

During the 2009–10 season, Pacers forward Tyler Hansbrough (drafted in 2009) suffered a season-ending ear injury, and without center Jeff Foster, the Pacers again fell into another season under .500 and missed the playoffs for four years in a row. Despite another disappointing season, the Pacers managed to sweep the waning Detroit Pistons for the first time in 5 years, and the abysmal New Jersey Nets. The team showed signs of life near the end of the season, winning nearly all of their last 14 games.

In May 2010, after completing his rookie season, guard A. J. Price suffered a knee injury during a charity pick-up game that would require surgery. His expected rehabilitation was to last between 4 and 6 months, to be back just in time for training camp.

2010–2017: The Paul George era

In the 2010 NBA draft, the Pacers selected forward/guard Paul George with the 10th overall pick. In the second round, they drafted guard Lance Stephenson, as well as forward Ryan Reid. The draft rights to Reid were traded on draft night to the Oklahoma City Thunder in exchange for the rights to forward/center Magnum Rolle. The Pacers signed George to his rookie contract on July 1, 2010. Stephenson signed a multi-year contract with the team on July 22. Just before training camp, Rolle was signed, along with big man Lance Allred. Both were cut before the regular season began.

On August 11, 2010, the Pacers acquired guard Darren Collison and swingman James Posey from the New Orleans Hornets in a four-team, five-player deal. Troy Murphy was dealt to the New Jersey Nets in that trade.

In the 2010–11 season, the team went 2–3 in the first five games. On November 9, in a home game against Denver, the team scored 54 points in the 3rd quarter alone, shooting 20–21 in the process, on the way to a 144–113 rout of the Nuggets. Led by Mike Dunleavy's 24 points in the period, the team set a franchise record for most points in a quarter and was only four points short of the all-time NBA record for points in a quarter (58) set in the 1970s.

On January 30, 2011, the Pacers relieved Jim O'Brien of his coaching duties and named assistant coach Frank Vogel interim head coach.

With a victory over the Washington Wizards on April 6, 2011, the Pacers clinched their first playoff berth since 2006. In the first round, they were defeated by the No. 1 seed Chicago Bulls in five games. Despite a lopsided comparison in terms of the two teams' win–loss records, three of the four Pacers' losses were close, losing games 1–3 by an average of five points.

2011–2014: Championship aspirations
The Pacers named Vogel their permanent head coach on July 7, 2011. They acquired George Hill from the San Antonio Spurs on draft night. After the lockout, and losing Mike Dunleavy Jr. to free–agency, the Pacers signed former two-time All-Star power forward David West to a two-year deal. These new players contributed to the Pacers' record of 21–12 at the All-Star break. The Pacers acquired another key piece in Leandro Barbosa from the Toronto Raptors at the trade deadline, mid-season.

At the end of the 2011–12 season, the team, led in scoring by Danny Granger, clinched the playoffs as the third seed in the Eastern Conference. They finished with a 42–24 record, their best record since their 2003–04 season. On May 8, 2012, the Pacers defeated the Orlando Magic 105–87 to win their first playoff series since 2005 and would go on to play the Miami Heat in the Eastern Conference Semifinals. On May 15, 2012, they defeated Miami to tie the second-round series at 1–1. On May 17, they again beat Miami 94–75 to take the series lead 2–1. However, despite a hard-fought series between the two, the Heat won Game 6 to close the series at 4–2.

Back–to–back Eastern Conference Finals appearances
The following season, Granger was sidelined by a knee injury and managed only to play five games. Granger made his return during the 2013–14 season; however, he failed to regain his form of the previous seasons. Granger was then traded to the Philadelphia 76ers for wing Evan Turner and forward Lavoy Allen in a swap that took place approximately 30 minutes before the trade deadline.

On June 26, 2012, general manager David Morway officially resigned. The following day, president of basketball operations, Larry Bird stepped down. Bird and Morway were officially replaced by Donnie Walsh and Kevin Pritchard, respectively. Walsh returned to the organization after spending the previous three seasons in the Knicks' front office. Pritchard was promoted by the Pacers after serving as the team's director of player personnel. In the 2012 NBA draft, the Pacers selected Miles Plumlee with the 26th pick and acquired Orlando Johnson, the 36th pick from the Sacramento Kings. The team also acquired key bench players Ian Mahinmi, Gerald Green, and D.J. Augustin. 

On April 7, 2013, the Pacers clinched their first Central Division championship since the 2003–04 season. They finished the 2012–13 season with a 49–32 record, the 3rd seed in the Eastern Conference, and beat the Atlanta Hawks in the first round of the playoffs. The Pacers then beat the New York Knicks in six games to advance to the Eastern Conference Finals for the first time since 2004 to face the defending champs, the Miami Heat. The Pacers lost Game 1 of the Eastern Conference Finals on May 22, 2013, in overtime 103–102. On May 24, 2013, in Game 2 of the Eastern Conference Finals, the Pacers were victorious by a score of 97–93. The game was clinched for Indiana after David West deflected a pass from LeBron James. The team headed home to Indianapolis, where they had been a perfect 6–0 in the playoffs. The Heat won Game 3 in Indianapolis on May 26, 2013, with contributions from role players Udonis Haslem and Chris Andersen, and won 114–96. The Pacers bounced back in Game 4 – with a strong contribution from Lance Stephenson – and won 99–92. The Pacers lost Game 5 in Miami on May 30 but won Game 6 at home on June 1, extending the series to Game 7. The Pacers were defeated by Miami, 99–76.

One year after stepping down, Larry Bird returned as president of basketball operations. Donnie Walsh, who was brought back to hold the position for Bird, was named a consultant for the Pacers. In the 2013 NBA draft, the Pacers selected Solomon Hill with the 23rd overall pick. During the 2013 off-season, the Pacers made strengthening their bench a priority, resulting in the acquisitions of point guard C. J. Watson, and forwards Chris Copeland and Luis Scola, the latter being acquired via trade with the Phoenix Suns. 

The 2013–14 season saw the Pacers jump to an explosive first half of a season, as they started the season 33–7 thanks to the rise of Paul George and Lance Stephenson. On January 14, 2014, Vogel was named the Eastern Conference head coach for 2014 NBA All-Star Game. Paul George and Roy Hibbert were selected for the All-Star Game. The Pacers signed 2x NBA champion and 2012 All-Star Andrew Bynum for the remainder of the season. However, after the All-Star Break, the Pacers collapsed. After starting the season 40–11, the Pacers crashed and stumbled to a 16–15 finish, with rumors of fighting in the locker room being a potential cause for the meltdown. Regardless, they managed to hold onto their first seed in the East, finished the season with a 56–26 record.

The Pacers started off the playoffs against the Atlanta Hawks, defeating them in 7 games. The Pacers then defeated Washington in 6 games in the semifinals, then a rematch with the second-seeded and defending champion Miami in the Eastern Conference Finals. The Pacers surprised many critics, taking Game 1 in the Eastern Conference Finals with a score of 107–95. Unfortunately for the Pacers, they ended up losing the next 3 to the Heat before managing to avoid elimination in Game 5 with a close win over the Heat. The game was notable for the infamous incident where Lance Stephenson blew into LeBron James' ear. Despite the win, the Pacers were eliminated in Game 6 by the Miami Heat for the third straight year.

2014–2017: George's injury and final seasons

On August 1, 2014, Paul George, who was playing in a Team USA scrimmage in preparation for the FIBA World Cup, suffered a catastrophic open fracture to his right leg (tibia and fibula) while trying to defend James Harden on a fast break. As he tried to defend Harden from advancing to the rim, George's leg caught on the stanchion of the hoop and fractured. He was stretchered off of the court. A day later, George successfully underwent surgery. He was expected to miss the entire 2014–15 season. On April 5, 2015, Paul George returned from his injury to play in a game against the Miami Heat. George shot 5 of 12 from the field and tallied two steals, two rebounds, and two assists in a winning effort. He played for fifteen minutes. After failing to reach the 2015 NBA Playoffs, the team departed with core players Roy Hibbert, David West, and Luis Scola. In the 2015 NBA Draft, the Pacers selected Myles Turner 11th overall. 

During the offseason, the Pacers signed star Monta Ellis as well as role player Jordan Hill, while acquiring Ty Lawson during the season. Paul George fully recovered from his injury and made the 2016 NBA All-Star Game as a starter. The Pacers would go on to lose game 7 in the first round against the Toronto Raptors ending their 2015-2016 season. Despite the Pacers going  and making the playoffs, on May 5, 2016, Pacers' president Larry Bird announced that head coach Frank Vogel's contract would not be renewed, citing a need for "a new voice" to lead the players. Later that month former Seattle SuperSonics and Portland Trail Blazers head coach Nate McMillan was promoted to replace Vogel.

The team made several off-season moves, acquiring new starters Jeff Teague and Thaddeus Young, as well as key bench players Al Jefferson and Aaron Brooks. During the season, the Pacers waived Rodney Stuckey in order to sign former fan-favorite Lance Stephenson. The Pacers qualified to play in the 2017 NBA Playoffs with a  record, which earned them the number 7 playoff seed in the Eastern Conference. However, they were given a quick exit by the defending champions, the Cleveland Cavaliers, who swept them in four games.

2017–2020: The Oladipo & Sabonis era
On June 30, 2017, Paul George was traded to the Oklahoma City Thunder for Victor Oladipo and Domantas Sabonis. The Pacers received heavy criticism for this trade, but it would eventually prove to be the best season of Oladipo's career, with him showing an increase in points, steals, assists, rebounds, free throw percentage, field goal percentage, as well as three-point percentage, which resulted to winning the NBA Most Improved Player Award. Sabonis also showed an increase in points, rebounds, and assists while leading the Pacers in rebounding during the 2017–18 season. Oladipo would be selected as a 2018 NBA All-Star reserve, while Sabonis was selected to represent Team World in the Rising Stars Challenge. Oladipo ended the season leading the NBA in steals per game. The team welcomed back former Pacer Darren Collison as well as newcomers Bojan Bogdanović and Cory Joseph. The Pacers ended the season with a 48–34 record, which earned them the fifth seed in the Eastern Conference. Their record was a six-game improvement from last season with Paul George. The Pacers faced the Cleveland Cavaliers in the first round of the 2018 NBA playoffs for the second year in a row. After taking a 2–1 series lead, the Pacers fell to the Cavaliers in seven games.

The 2018-2019 season welcomed new players Tyreke Evans, Wesley Matthews, and Doug McDermott. Oladipo would be selected as an All-Star reserve again for the 2019 game. However, while playing against the Toronto Raptors on January 23, 2019, he left the game with a ruptured quad tendon, and he was ruled out for the rest of the season. Regardless, the Pacers again finished the season going 48–34 and secured a playoff spot for the fourth consecutive time on March 22, but were swept in the first round of the 2019 playoffs by the Boston Celtics.

After an active 2019 off-season, the Pacers fielded four new starters on opening night. Holdover Myles Turner was joined by reserve-turned-starter Domantas Sabonis, as well as new acquisitions Malcolm Brogdon, T. J. Warren, and Jeremy Lamb, who was slated to become a top reserve until all-star guard Victor Oladipo returned from injury. The Pacers also signed reserves T. J. McConnell and Justin Holiday, with Holiday joining his younger brother Aaron Holiday on the team. The Pacers also saw three players with the name "T. J." take the court in McConnell, Warren, and Leaf. in Following an 0–3 start to the season, the Pacers held a 26–15 record halfway through the season, ranking them fifth place in the Eastern Conference. Domantas Sabonis averaged a career-best 18.5 points, 12.4 rebounds, and 5 assists a game. Subsequently, Sabonis was named an NBA All-Star for the first time in his career. Unfortunately, his season was cut short due to a foot injury and would miss the postseason.

Following the suspension of the 2019–20 NBA season, the Pacers were one of the 22 teams invited to the NBA Bubble to participate in the final 8 games of the regular season. The Pacers would finish the 2019-2020 regular season with a record of 45-28 and headed into the playoffs as the 4th seed in the Eastern Conference. On August 12, 2020, the team announced that they had extended Nate McMillan's contract. They then matched up with the 5th seeded Miami Heat where they would go on to lose the first-round series 4-0 which subsequently ended their 2019–2020 season.

2020–present: Rebuilding era
Following the loss to the Heat, the Pacers parted ways with head coach Nate McMillan, despite the recent extension. On October 20, 2020, it was announced that former Toronto Raptors assistant coach, Nate Bjorkgren, had signed a multi-year deal to become the next head coach. On January 16, 2021, Victor Oladipo was traded to the Houston Rockets as a part of a four-team deal that sent James Harden to the Brooklyn Nets and Caris LeVert to Indiana. Sabonis would go on to earn his second NBA All-Star appearance during the 2020-2021 Pacers season. The team also signed Oshae Brissett this year. The season would end in the 2021 NBA Play-In Tournament in a loss to the Washington Wizards. After missing the 2021 NBA Playoffs, and amid reported locker room tension, the Pacers fired Bjorkgren on June 9, 2021.

On June 24, 2021, the Pacers announced that they had reached an agreement with former Dallas Mavericks coach Rick Carlisle to become the next head coach following Bjorkgren's departure. Carlisle previously was an assistant coach for the Pacers from 1997 to 2000, and was also the head coach of the Pacers previously from 2003 to 2007. The team also hired former Charlotte Hornets assistant and Indiana-native Ronald Nored as well as former Atlanta Hawks head coach Lloyd Pierce to serve as lead assistant to Carlisle. The arrival of Carlisle also brought over Jenny Boucek and Mike Weinar, both formerly serving with the Dallas Mavericks. Boucek served as the first female assistant coach for the Pacers franchise. In the 2021 NBA Draft, the Pacers selected Chris Duarte with the 13th pick and traded up for the 22nd pick, Isaiah Jackson. Duarte was selected to the 2022 NBA All-Rookie Second Team.

2022–present: Tyrese Haliburton era
The Pacers failed to qualify for the 2022 NBA Playoffs with a record of 25–57 in the 2021–22 NBA season, which marks the first time the team failed to reach the playoffs for consecutive seasons since 2007–10. The 2021–22 season also saw fan-favorite Lance Stephenson serve his third stint with the Pacers franchise. During the season, the Pacers traded away core players including Domantas Sabonis, Caris LeVert, Justin Holiday, Jeremy Lamb, and Malcolm Brogdon over the summer. In return, the Pacers notably received multiple first–round draft picks, sharpshooter Buddy Hield, veteran Daniel Theis, as well as young stars Tyrese Haliburton, Jalen Smith and Aaron Nesmith, all lottery picks in the 2020 NBA Draft. 

The team would go on to draft Bennedict Mathurin 6th overall in the 2022 NBA Draft along with standout second-round pick Andrew Nembhard. Mathurin was the Pacers' highest pick the franchise has owned since selecting Rik Smits second overall in the 1988 NBA Draft. On January 31, 2023, both Mathurin and Nembhard were named 2023 NBA Rising Stars. Tyrese Haliburton was also selected to his first ever NBA All-Star Game in 2023 as a reserve guard for the Eastern Conference. At the 2023 trade deadline, the team acquired 3 future second round picks, Jordan Nwora, Serge Ibaka, as well as Indiana–native and former Pacer, George Hill in exchange for the draft rights to Juan Pablo Vaulet. Both Tyrese Haliburton and Buddy Hield were selected to participate in the 2023 NBA Three-Point Contest.

Home arenas

Indiana State Fairgrounds Coliseum (1967–1974)
The Indiana State Fairgrounds Coliseum was home to the Pacers from 1967 to 1974. The Pacers were very successful in their tenure at the Coliseum, winning three ABA Championships. They captured the ABA titles in 1969–70, defeating the Los Angeles Stars in 6 games, in 1971–72, defeating the New York Nets in 6 games, and in the 1972–73 season, defeating the Kentucky Colonels in 7 games. The team moved to Market Square Arena in 1974. In 1976, the Pacers became a franchise in the National Basketball Association (NBA) when the ABA merged with the NBA.

Market Square Arena (1974–1999)

Market Square Arena was home of the Indiana Pacers from 1974 to 1999. The first Pacers basketball game ever held in the arena was a preseason game against the Milwaukee Bucks; attendance was 16,929. The first regular-season ABA game in the arena was held on October 18, 1974, against the San Antonio Spurs; the Pacers lost in double overtime, 129–121 in front of 7,473 fans. The first Pacers victory in Market Square Arena came on October 23 with a 122–107 win over the Spirits of St. Louis. The 1974–75 season ended for the Pacers with the ABA Finals played in Market Square Arena and Freedom Hall against their archrivals, the Kentucky Colonels. The Colonels defeated the Pacers in that championship series, winning the ABA title in five games (4–1). The 1975–76 Pacers won their final home ABA game in Market Square Arena with a 109–95 victory against the Colonels. (Kentucky won the next game by one point to win the series and advance, ending the Pacers' ABA tenure.) The Pacers continued to play in Market Square Arena after they joined the NBA, with their first game at the arena as an NBA team being a 129–122 overtime loss to the Boston Celtics on October 21, 1976. Michael Jordan's return to the Chicago Bulls after his first retirement took place at Market Square Arena in a loss to the Pacers on March 19, 1995. The final Pacers game to be played in Market Square Arena was a pre-season exhibition game against the Utah Jazz on October 23, 1999.

Conseco, Bankers Life, and Gainbridge Fieldhouse (1999–present)

The Indiana Pacers play their home games at Gainbridge Fieldhouse, which opened in 1999.  Gainbridge Fieldhouse is located in downtown Indianapolis. It is owned and operated by the Capital Improvement Board, City of Indianapolis, Indiana and its groundbreaking was on July 22, 1997, by Ellerbe Becket Architects & Engineers. Originally known as Conseco Fieldhouse, the arena officially opened on November 6, 1999. The Fieldhouse is considered one of the best arenas in the NBA, being rated the No. 1 venue in the NBA according to the Sports Business Journal/Sports Business Daily Reader Survey. The arena was renamed to Bankers Life Fieldhouse on December 22, 2011, after a subsidiary company of Conseco. The arena adopted its current name on September 27, 2021, being sponsored by Indianapolis-based financial platform Gainbridge. It presently seats 18,165 for basketball games, down from the original 18,345 due to removal of bleacher seats at the south end in favor of adding a premium club area known as Legends. Gainbridge Fieldhouse is also the home of the WNBA's Indiana Fever, who are also owned by Herb Simon via Pacers Sports & Entertainment (PS&E). 

Frequently, it hosts the Big Ten men's basketball tournament in 2002, 2004, 2006, 2008–2012, 2014, 2016, and 2022. Recently, Gainbridge has been the home to the NCAA Division I men's basketball tournament in the years 2017, 2021, 2022, and 2024. Previously, the men's tournament was held at Market Square Arena in 1978 and 1982. Furthermore, the stadium hosted the NCAA Women's Division I Basketball Tournament in 2011, 2016, and 2028. Presently, it hosts concerts and other philanthropic events as well.

Logos and uniforms
The Indiana Pacers colors are (navy) blue, yellow (gold), cool gray and white. The original team colors of blue and yellow, using a more medium shade of blue, came from the Flag of Indiana. The Pacers wear the usual white home uniform with blue and yellow trim. Their road uniform is blue with yellow trim. They also have a third uniform which is yellow with blue trim, which is worn occasionally at home or on the road. During the 1983 season, they wore the gold home uniform with blue and white trim at home.  From 1997 to 2005 the Pacers sported pinstripe uniforms. One of their most iconic uniforms, worn from 1990 to 1997, and the uniform that launched Reggie Miller into superstardom, was designed by American track and field athlete Florence Griffith-Joyner, and featured a modern typeset that resembled Helvetica. The jerseys were often referred to as the "Flo-Jos" by Pacers fans.

On September 29, 2005, the Indiana Pacers unveiled then-new uniforms.

On July 21, 2015, the Indiana Pacers, in collaboration with Metro-Goldwyn-Mayer (MGM) Studios, unveiled a new uniform based on the 1986 motion picture Hoosiers. The Pacers wore these maroon and gold "Hickory" (the name and colors of the fictional High School from the film) uniforms for several home games and a few select road contests during the 2015–16 season. It is the first time a major North American pro sports team wore a uniform based on a film.

The Indiana Pacers unveiled new uniforms and logos to coincide with the NBA's uniform contract with Nike on July 28, 2017.

Rivalries

Detroit Pistons
The Pacers and Pistons met for the first time in the 1990 Playoffs; the Pistons swept the Pacers in three straight games on their way to their second straight NBA championship. But the rivalry truly began in the 2003–04 season. The Pacers finished with a league-best 61 wins and were led by Jermaine O'Neal, Ron Artest, and Reggie Miller, and coached by Rick Carlisle. Carlisle had been fired by Detroit at the end of the previous season. Detroit was led by Chauncey Billups, Ben Wallace, Rasheed Wallace, Tayshaun Prince, and Richard Hamilton, and coached by Larry Brown. Indiana won the first 3 matchups in the regular season, before being defeated by the Pistons in the final regular-season meeting at the Palace. That was also the first time the two met after Rasheed Wallace was traded to Detroit.

They met in the 2004 Eastern Conference Finals. Indiana narrowly won Game 1, thanks to some late heroics from Miller. Rasheed, unimpressed, stated "They Will Not Win Game 2" during an interview before the second game (locally known as the "Guaran-Sheed" victory). Late in Game 2, Detroit held a two-point lead, Billups turned over the ball, and Miller appeared to have an uncontested lay-up that would have tied the game. However, before Miller could score, he was chased down by Prince, who leapt from behind and blocked the shot. Near the end of Game 6, when Detroit held a slight lead, Artest committed a flagrant foul on Hamilton, which nearly caused tempers to boil over. Detroit won the series 4–2, and went on to win the NBA title.

On November 19, 2004, at The Palace of Auburn Hills, what has become known as the Pacers–Pistons brawl took place. Nine players were suspended for varying lengths. Artest received the longest penalty: the remainder of the season.

That year teams split the four regular season meetings. They met in the Eastern Conference Semifinals and split the first two games. The Pacers blew an 18-point lead, but still won Game 3 in Indianapolis. However, just as he did a year earlier, Rasheed promised a win in Game 4 saying, "When we return, we will be tied at 2." The Pistons won Games 4 and 5. The Pacers, knowing a loss would lead to Miller's retirement, fought hard, but fell to the Pistons 88–79.

New York Knicks

During the 1990s, the Knicks and Pacers were perennial playoff teams. They met in the playoffs 6 times from 1993 to 2000, fueling a rivalry epitomized by the enmity between Miller and prominent Knick fan Spike Lee. The rivalry was likened by Miller to the Hatfield–McCoy feud, and described by The New York Times, in 1998 as being "as combustible as any in the league". The Knicks and Pacers met in the 2013 Eastern Conference Semifinals with the Pacers defeating the Knicks 4–2.

Miami Heat
A rivalry with the Miami Heat was triggered in the Eastern Conference Semifinals of the 2012 NBA playoffs. The two previously met in the 2004 NBA playoffs (when Indiana won 4–2). , the only player still left from either team is Udonis Haslem of the Heat. Both head coaches were fined for statements made relating to the officiating: Frank Vogel accused the Heat of flopping before the series started, while Erik Spoelstra took offense to what he perceived to be deliberate head-hunting of his players on the part of the Pacers. Indiana took a 2–1 lead after Miami's Chris Bosh was sidelined with an abdominal strain. Powered by LeBron James and Dwyane Wade, Miami won three straight games to take the series, 4–2. The series was marked by several suspensions, flagrant fouls, and confrontations between the players: Tyler Hansbrough's flagrant foul on Dwyane Wade (which drew blood), Udonis Haslem's retaliatory flagrant foul on Hansborough (which led to Haslem's Game 6 suspension), Wade colliding with Darren Collison in transition, Juwan Howard confronting Lance Stephenson over the latter's flashing of the choke sign to James, and Dexter Pittman elbowing Stephenson in the neck (which led to his own three-game suspension). Indiana's Danny Granger received technical fouls in three consecutive games for his confrontations with Heat players; he stripped James of his headband in Game 2 while attempting to block a shot, pulled the back of James' jersey in Game 3 while trying to stop a fast-break, and chest-bumped Wade in Game 4 after the latter was fouled by Roy Hibbert.

The following season saw improvements for both teams, from Miami's acquisition of Ray Allen and Chris Andersen, to the emergence of Paul George and Lance Stephenson. Notably, it was after the Heat lost to the Pacers that they compiled a 27-game winning streak; the last time the Heat lost two in a row in the year were the games against Indiana and Portland. During the waning minutes of Game 6 in the Semifinals between the Pacers and the New York Knicks, the Pacers' fans were chanting "Beat The Heat" as their team beat their old New York rivals. True to form, the Heat and the Pacers met in the Conference Finals of the 2013 NBA playoffs on May 22, 2013. Several instances of physicality became prominent in the series: Shane Battier received an offensive foul for throwing his knee at Hibbert's midsection; Hibbert claimed that it was intentional dirty play on the part of Battier. Andersen suffered a bloodied nose after colliding with David West. Ian Mahinmi received a retroactive flagrant foul for a grab of James' arm. Norris Cole latched a hand on West's groin area as he tried to slip through West. Wade received a retroactive flagrant foul for hitting Stephenson in the head, another incident that the Pacers, notably Paul George, felt was a dirty play. The Heat survived Game 1 on a James game-winning layup, while the Pacers came back to tie the series at 1–1 after forcing James into two late fourth-quarter turnovers for Game 2. In Game 3, the Heat set a team record for points in a post-season half with 70. It was the first time the Pacers had given up 70 points since 1992. Allen's single turnover was the least ever suffered by the Heat in a first half. Their five total turnovers is tied for the fewest in franchise history. The Game 3 victory marked the first time that an NBA team had won five straight road games by double digits. The Heat won the series 4–3, with a 99–76 win in game 7. In 2014, the Pacers and Heat renewed their rivalry in a second consecutive East Finals match up with the Heat eliminating the Pacers again. Miami and Indiana would meet for the first time since 2014 in the 2020 playoffs with the Heat sweeping the Pacers in the first round.

Season-by-season record
List of the last five seasons completed by the Pacers. For the full season-by-season history, see List of Indiana Pacers seasons.

Note: GP = Games played, W = Wins, L = Losses, W–L% = Winning percentage

Players

Current roster

Retained draft rights
The Pacers hold the draft rights to the following unsigned draft picks who have been playing outside the NBA. A drafted player, either an international draftee or a college draftee who is not signed by the team that drafted him, is allowed to sign with any non-NBA teams. In this case, the team retains the player's draft rights in the NBA until one year after the player's contract with the non-NBA team ends. This list includes draft rights that were acquired from trades with other teams.

Retired numbers

Notes:
 1 Also served as coach (1988)
 The NBA retired Bill Russell's No. 6 for all its member teams on August 11, 2022.

Naismith Memorial Basketball Hall of Famers

Notes:
In total, Mullin was inducted into the Hall of Fame twice – as player and as member of the 1992 Olympic team.
He also coached the Pacers in 1988.
Inducted posthumously.

FIBA Hall of Fame

Draft picks

Head coaches

There have been 13 head coaches for the Pacers franchise. Larry Staverman was the first coach of the team in 1967, when the team was in the ABA. Coach Bobby Leonard has the most wins in franchise history, with 529 in his 12 seasons with the team. After Leonard, Jack McKinney, George Irvine, and Dr. Jack Ramsay. When Ramsay abruptly resigned in 1988 after the team got off to a horrid start, Pacers legend Mel Daniels took over on an interim basis for two games, before Irvine returned for 20 more. Dick Versace then led the Pacers through another sub-par stretch before Bob Hill got the Pacers back to the playoffs and into contention. Then in 1993, Larry Brown joined the Pacers franchise and led the team to many playoff appearances as Reggie Miller blossomed into a superstar and eventual Hall of Famer. Larry Bird took over the team in 1997 and coached until 2000. Bird took the Pacers to their only NBA Finals appearance in the 1999–2000 season. Isiah Thomas, Rick Carlisle, and Jim O'Brien were next up as the Pacers top coach. The most recent head coach of the Pacers was Frank Vogel, until May 5, 2016, when his contract was not renewed after the number 7 seeded Pacers lost game 7 of the first round of the 2016 NBA playoffs to the number two seeded Toronto Raptors. Subsequently, associate head coach Nate McMillan was promoted to the top spot.  After 4 seasons in which he compiled a 183–136 record, McMillan and the team parted ways on August 26, 2020, just two weeks after it had been announced that the team had re-signed him.  On October 20, 2020, the team hired former Toronto Raptors assistant coach Nate Bjorkgren as their new head coach. Bjorkgren would lead the Pacers to a 34–38 season in his lone season and the team missed the playoffs. On June 24, 2021, the Pacers re-hired Rick Carlisle for a second stint as the team's head coach.

Franchise records and individual awards

Franchise leaders
Bold denotes still active with team.

Italic denotes still active but not with team.

Points scored (regular season) (as of the end of the 2021–22 season)

 Reggie Miller (25,279)
 Rik Smits (12,871)
 Billy Knight (10,780)
 Roger Brown (10,058)
 Jermaine O'Neal (9,580)
 Danny Granger (9,571)
 George McGinnis (9,545)
 Vern Fleming (9,535)
 Mel Daniels (9,314)
 Freddie Lewis (9,257)
 Chuck Person (9,096)
 Herb Williams (8,637)
 Paul George (8,090)
 Bob Netolicky (8,078)
 Billy Keller (6,588)
 Dale Davis (6,523)
 Detlef Schrempf (6,009)
 Roy Hibbert (5,909)
 Jalen Rose (5,712)
 Myles Turner (5,485)

Other statistics (regular season) (as of the end of the 2021–22 season)

NBA individual awards

NBA Defensive Player of the Year
Ron Artest – 2004

NBA Rookie of the Year
Chuck Person – 1987

NBA Sixth Man of the Year
Detlef Schrempf – 1991, 1992

NBA Most Improved Player of the Year
Jalen Rose – 2000
Jermaine O'Neal – 2002
Danny Granger – 2009
Paul George – 2013
Victor Oladipo – 2018

NBA Coach of the Year
Jack McKinney – 1981
Larry Bird – 1998

NBA Executive of the Year
Larry Bird – 2012

All-NBA Second Team
Jermaine O'Neal – 2004

All-NBA Third Team
Reggie Miller – 1995, 1996, 1998
Jermaine O'Neal – 2002, 2003
Ron Artest – 2004
Paul George – 2013, 2014, 2016
Victor Oladipo – 2018

NBA All-Defensive First Team
Don Buse – 1977
Ron Artest – 2004
Paul George – 2014
Victor Oladipo – 2018

NBA All-Defensive Second Team
Dudley Bradley – 1981
Micheal Williams – 1992
Derrick McKey – 1995, 1996
Ron Artest – 2003
Paul George – 2013, 2016
Roy Hibbert – 2014

Magic Johnson Award
Jermaine O'Neal – 2004

J. Walter Kennedy Citizenship Award
Reggie Miller – 2004
Malcolm Brogdon – 2020

NBA All-Rookie First Team
Clark Kellogg – 1983
Steve Stipanovich – 1984
Chuck Person – 1987
Rik Smits – 1989

NBA All-Rookie Second Team
Jamaal Tinsley – 2002
Danny Granger – 2006
Paul George – 2011
Myles Turner – 2016
Chris Duarte – 2022

NBA All-Seeding Games First Team
T. J. Warren – 2020

NBA 50–40–90 Club
Reggie Miller – 1994

NBA Annual Assists Leaders
Don Buse – 1977
Mark Jackson – 1997

NBA Annual Steals Leaders
Don Buse – 1977
Victor Oladipo – 2018

NBA Annual Blocks Leaders
Myles Turner – 2019, 2021

NBA Annual Three-Point Field Goal Leaders
Don Buse – 1982
Reggie Miller – 1993, 1997

NBA Annual Three-Point Field Goal Percentage Leaders
Darren Collison – 2018

NBA Annual Free Throw Percentage Leaders
Reggie Miller – 1991, 1999, 2001, 2002, 2005
Chris Mullin – 1998

NBA 75th Anniversary Team
Reggie Miller – 2021

Top 15 Greatest Coaches in NBA History
Larry Brown – 2021
Jack Ramsay – 2021

Top 10 Coaches in NBA History
Jack Ramsay – 1996

ABA individual awards

ABA Most Valuable Player Award
Mel Daniels – 1969, 1971
George McGinnis – 1975

ABA Playoffs Most Valuable Player
Roger Brown – 1970
Freddie Lewis – 1972
George McGinnis – 1973

ABA All-Star Game Most Valuable Player Award
Mel Daniels – 1971

ABA All-Star East Head coach
Bobby Leonard – 1970

ABA All-Star selections
Bob Netolicky – 1968–1971
Roger Brown – 1968, 1970, 1971, 1972
Freddie Lewis – 1968, 1970, 1972
Mel Daniels – 1969–1974
George McGinnis – 1973, 1974, 1975
Billy Knight – 1976
Don Buse – 1976

All-ABA First Team
Mel Daniels – 1969, 1970, 1971
Roger Brown – 1971
George McGinnis – 1974, 1975
Billy Knight – 1976

All-ABA Second Team
Roger Brown – 1968, 1970
Bob Netolicky – 1970
George McGinnis – 1973
Mel Daniels – 1973
Don Buse – 1976

ABA All-Defensive Team
Don Buse – 1975, 1976

ABA All-Rookie Team
Bob Netolicky – 1968
George McGinnis – 1972
Billy Knight – 1975

ABA All-Time Team
Mel Daniels – 1997
George McGinnis – 1997
Roger Brown – 1997
Donnie Freeman – 1997
Freddie Lewis – 1997
Billy Knight – 1997
Bob Netolicky – 1997
Warren Jabali – 1997

ABA All-Time Coaches
Bobby "Slick" Leonard – 1997

NBA All-Star Weekend

NBA All-Star selections
Billy Knight – 1977
Don Buse – 1977
Reggie Miller – 1990, 1995, 1996, 1998, 2000
Detlef Schrempf – 1993
Rik Smits – 1998
Dale Davis – 2000
Jermaine O'Neal – 2002, 2003, 2004, 2005, 2006, 2007
Brad Miller – 2003
Ron Artest – 2004
Danny Granger – 2009
Roy Hibbert – 2012, 2014
Paul George – 2013, 2014, 2016, 2017
Victor Oladipo – 2018, 2019
Domantas Sabonis – 2020, 2021
Tyrese Haliburton – 2023

NBA All-Star Eastern Conference Head Coach
Larry Bird – 1998
Isiah Thomas – 2003
Rick Carlisle – 2004
Frank Vogel – 2014

NBA Rising Stars Challenge Head Coach
Nate McMillan – 2014

NBA All-Star Legends Game
Phil Chenier – 1991
Dan Roundfield – 1991, 1992, 1993

NBA Three-Point Contest
Reggie Miller – 1989, 1990, 1993, 1995, 1998
Danny Granger – 2009
Paul George – 2013
Tyrese Haliburton – 2023
Buddy Hield – 2023

NBA Rising Stars Challenge
Antonio Davis – 1994
Erick Dampier – 1997
Jamaal Tinsley – 2002, 2003
Šarūnas Jasikevičius – 2006
Danny Granger – 2006, 2007
Paul George – 2012
Myles Turner – 2017
Domantas Sabonis – 2018
Chris Duarte – 2022
Tyrese Haliburton – 2022
Bennedict Mathurin – 2023
Andrew Nembhard – 2023

NBA Skills Challenge
Domantas Sabonis – 2020, 2021

NBA Clorox Clutch Challenge
Tyrese Haliburton – 2022
Chris Duarte – 2022

NBA Slam Dunk Contest
Darnell Hillman – 1977
Terence Stansbury – 1985, 1986
Kenny Williams – 1991
Antonio Davis – 1994
Jonathan Bender – 2001
Fred Jones – 2004
Paul George – 2012, 2014
Gerald Green – 2013
Glenn Robinson III – 2017
Victor Oladipo – 2018
Cassius Stanley – 2021
Winners

Mascot
Boomer, the Pacers Panther, has been the official team mascot since the 1991–1992 season. Additionally, Boomer's role has been filled by the same person, even through the current season (2023). He used to have a partner, known as Bowser. He was a canine ("K-9") mascot that worked in tandem with Boomer. He was retired during the 2009–10 season.

Dance squad
Founded in 1967, the same year as the Pacers franchise, the Indiana Pacemates were one of the original professional sports dance squads and the first such entity in the NBA. Originally known in the ABA era as the Marathon Scoreboard Girls, then later as the Paul Harris Pacesetters, the Pacemates name has been used since the 1972–1973 season.

References

External links

 

 
American Basketball Association teams
National Basketball Association teams
Basketball teams established in 1967
1967 establishments in Indiana